Egba Ake, otherwise known as Egba Alake, is one of the five sections of Egbaland, the others being Oke-Ona, Gbagura, the Owu and Ibara (historically, Ibara is part of Yewa, not Egba, although it is located in the present day Abeokuta geographically). It is a traditional state which joins with its bordering sections to form something of a high kingship.
The Alake of Abeokuta, or Alake of Egbaland, is the traditional ruler of the Egba clan of Yoruba in the city of Abeokuta in southwestern Nigeria.

The Egba Ake section is seen by traditionalists as Abeokuta's aristocracy due to the fact that its principal noblemen, the Omo-Iya-Marun, serve as the kingmakers of the Alake, who must himself also come from this section.

History

The Egba people's original homeland in the Egba forest was established by Yoruba migrants from elsewhere. According to The History of the Yorubas by Samuel Johnson, Eso Ikoyi chiefs in the retinue of the first Alake of the Egba joined him in founding a new community - the confederacy of towns that became known as Orile Egba - in the forest after they left the nascent Oyo empire in around the 13th century AD. Orile Egba continued to exist until its destruction during the Yoruba civil war of the 19th century. As a result, many of the leading families of the Egba Ake claim descent from the Eso Ikoyis today.

Abeokuta was founded as a replacement for Orile Egba in around 1830 by the Egbas after the collapse of the Oyo empire during the civil war. The city was founded because of its strong defensive physical position by refugees trying to protect themselves against slave raiders from Dahomey, who were trying to benefit from the war.

Chief Shodeke, the first paramount chief of Abeokuta and the rest of Egbaland, was a member of the Egba Ake section. Using oral traditions of the Alake's claim to membership of Oduduwa's family being superior to that of any of the other Egba kings to cement the section's position, he is said to have allocated the tracts of land that each of the junior sections settled upon following their arrival in the city. The Egba Ake have been the traditional landowners of Egbaland ever since this event.

In 1832, Abeokuta was involved in war with the people of Ijebu Remo, and in 1834 with the Ibadan people. Sporadic fighting continued with the people of Ota (1842), Ado (1844), Ibarapa (1849), Dahomey (1851), Ijebu-Ere (1851), Ijaye (1860–1862) and the Makun War of 1862–1864.

On 18 January 1893, a treaty was signed with the governor and commander-in-chief of the British Lagos Colony for the purpose of trade; the British recognized Egbaland as an independent state. In 1898, the Egba United Government was formed.

In 1904, an agreement was made where the British assumed jurisdiction in certain legal cases, and in the same year, the Alake Gbadebo paid a state visit to England. Over the following years, the British steadily assumed more responsibility for administration while continuing to formally recognize the Egba state.
In 1914, the kingdom was incorporated into the newly amalgamated British Colony and Protectorate of Nigeria.

In 1949, as a result of agitation by the women's rights leader Chief Funmilayo Ransome Kuti, the Alake Ladapo Ademola was forced to abdicate. He later returned to the throne.

Rulers

Rulers of the Egba in Abeokuta, who took the title "Alake" in 1854, were:

References

Works cited
 

Nigerian traditional states
Abeokuta
History of Abeokuta